Huang Bo (born August 26, 1974) is a Chinese actor, film director, singer and the current vice-chairman of China Film Association.  He is the winner of multiple Chinese film awards, and ranked 34th on Forbes China Celebrity 100 list in 2013, 62nd in 2014, 22nd in 2015, 30th in 2017, 2nd in 2019, 52nd in 2020.

Early life
Huang Bo was born on August 26, 1974 in Jiuquan, Gansu, and raised in Qingdao, Shandong, although his hail originally from Lintao County, Gansu.  Both of his parents worked as civil servants in the government.  Before Huang became an actor, he was a bar singer, dance instructor, film dubber and factory owner. During his time singing in bars, he even had his own band named "Blue Sand Wind" (蓝色风沙).

In 2000, Huang's friend since junior high school, actor Gao Hu, introduced him to director Guan Hu by chance, which started Huang's acting career.  Huang Bo wanted to study in the Beijing Film Academy, however he didn't receive the admission for the first time he applied. In 2002, Huang Bo finally got admitted to the Academy, studying in Dubbing.

Career
Two years later in 2004, Huang Bo graduated from the Academy and became a professional voice actor. Before Huang Bo's breakout role two years later, he had several small roles in different TV series.

In the year of 2006, Huang Bo participated in director Ning Hao's low-budget black comedy film Crazy Stone, which proved to be a runaway hit and garnered him much exposure. In 2007, Huang won his first major award, for Best Supporting Actor at the 7th Chinese Film Media Awards . Moreover, his performance in the film Cow won him the Best Actor award at the 46th Golden Horse Awards.

Huang Bo was considered one of the top actors in China in 2010.  During the two years between 2010 and 2011, Huang Bo performed in 5 films, and also started his music career.

In 2012, Huang's comedy film Lost in Thailand became the top-grossing domestic film at the Chinese box-office. He also starred in the suspense film Design of Death, which earned him Best Actor awards at the  Beijing College Student Film Festival and China Film Directors' Guild Award.

In 2013, Huang starred in Stephen Chow's shenmo blockbuster film, Journey to the West: Conquering the Demons playing Sun Wukong. He appeared for free in the comedy film The Chef, the Actor, the Scoundrel directed by Guan Hu, and the noir film thriller No Man's Land where he played a killer. With his films, Huang became the top-grossing actor of 2013.

In 2014, Huang starred in Peter Chan's film on child-abduction, Dearest as a devastated father whose son was abducted; which earned him Best Actor nominations at several film awards. The same year he starred alongside Xu Zheng in the comedy film Breakup Buddies, which became one of the  top-grossing domestic films at the Chinese box-office.

In 2015, Huang co-starred in the fantasy blockbuster Mojin: The Lost Legend, which became one of the highest-grossing films in China.

In 2017, Huang won the Golden Goblet Award for his performance in the crime film The Conformist. The same year he headlined the science fiction film Battle of Memories.

In 2018, he launched his directorial debut The Island.

In 2019, it was announced that Huang will play Jiang Ziya in the upcoming fantasy film series Fengshen Trilogy directed by Wuershan. The film is based on the novel Investiture of the Gods.

In August 2021, the first solo album "Songs Saved for You Over the Years" was released.

Personal life
The nickname of Huang Bo's wife is Xiao Ou, and they married in 2007. Huang Bo's daughter was born in July, 2011.

Filmography

Film

Television

Accolades

References

External links
 

1974 births
Living people
21st-century Chinese male actors
Male actors from Qingdao
Beijing Film Academy alumni
Chinese male film actors
Chinese male television actors
Best Supporting Actor Asian Film Award winners